Khanqah (also Romanized as Khānqāh) is a village in Kandovan Rural District of Kandovan District, Mianeh County, East Azerbaijan province, Iran. At the 2006 National Census, its population was 978 in 174 households. The following census in 2011 counted 752 people in 194 households. The latest census in 2016 showed a population of 827 people in 277 households; it was the largest village in its rural district.

References 

Meyaneh County

Populated places in East Azerbaijan Province

Populated places in Meyaneh County